Brahmacharya is a concept within Indian religions that literally means to stay in conduct within one's own Self. In Yoga, Hinduism, Buddhism and Jainism it generally refers to a lifestyle characterized by sexual continence or complete abstinence.

In the Hindu, Jain, and Buddhist monastic traditions, brahmacharya implies, among other things, the mandatory renunciation of sex and marriage. It is considered necessary for a monk's spiritual practice. Western notions of the religious life as practiced in monastic settings mirror these characteristics.

Etymology 
The word brahmacharya stems from two Sanskrit roots:
Brahman (Devanagari: ब्रह्म) meaning one's own Self, ultimate unchanging reality, absolute consciousness, much discussed in the Upanishads. Brahma is also the Vedic God of creation, no different from the Self or Atman. (Ayam Ātmā Brahma (अयम् आत्मा ब्रह्म) The Self of mine is that Brahma)
charya (चर्य), which means "occupation with, engaging, proceeding, behaviour, conduct, to follow, moving in, going after". This is often translated as activity, conduct, or mode of behaviour.

Hence, brahmacharya roughly means "to stay true to one's Self or ones own Atma" or "on the path of Brahma".

In ancient and medieval era Indian texts, the term brahmacharya is a concept with a more complex meaning indicating an overall lifestyle conducive to the pursuit of sacred knowledge and spiritual liberation. Brahmacharya is a means, not an end. It usually includes cleanliness, ahimsa, simple living, studies, meditation, and voluntary restraints on certain foods (eating only Sattvic food), on intoxicants, and on sexual behavior (both sex and masturbation, in some schools of thought).

As a virtue 
Brahmacharya is traditionally regarded as one of the five yamas in Yoga, as declared in verse 2.30 of Patanjali's Yoga Sutras. It is a form of self-restraint regarded as a virtue, and an observance recommended depending on an individual's context. For a married practitioner it means marital fidelity (not cheating on one's spouse); for a single person it means celibacy. Shandilya Upanishad includes brahmacharya as one of ten yamas in Chapter 1, defining it as "refraining from sexual intercourse in all places and in all states in mind, speech or body".

Patanjali in verse 2.38 states that the virtue of brahmacharya leads to the profit of virya (वीर्य). This Sanskrit word, virya, has been variously translated as virility and, by Vyasa, as strength and capacity. Vyasa explains that this virtue promotes other good qualities. Other ancient and medieval era texts of Hinduism describe the fruits of this virtue differently. For example, Pada Chandrika, Raja Marttanda, Sutrartha Bodhini, Mani Prabha and Yoga Sudhakara each state that brahmacharya must be understood as the voluntary restraint of power. Chandogya Upanishad in verses of chapter 8.5 extols brahmacharya as a sacrament and sacrifice which, once perfected, leads to realization of the Self (Atman), and thereafter becomes the habit of experiencing the Self in others and everything. Tattva Vaisharadi and Yoga Sarasangraha assert that brahmacharya leads to an increase in jñana-shakti (power of knowledge) and kriya-shakti (power of action).

The great epic Mahabharata describes the objective of brahmacharya as knowledge of Brahman (Book Five, Udyoga Parva, the Book of Effort). Brahmacharya leads one to union with the Supreme Self (Chapter 43). By subduing desire, the practice of self-restraint enables the student to learn, pay attention in thought, word and deed to the guru (teacher), and discover the truth embodied in the Vedas and Upanishads. According to the epic, the practice of studying and learning requires the "aid of time," as well as personal effort, ability, discussion, and practice, all of which are helped by the virtue of brahmacharya. A brahmachāri should do useful work, and the earnings he obtains should be given away as dakshina ("fee," "gift of thanks") to the guru. The epic declares that brahmacharya is one of twelve virtues, an essential part of angas in yoga and the path of perfecting perseverance and the pursuit of knowledge.

In Jainism 

Brahmacharya is one of the five major vows prescribed for the śrāvakā (layman) and ascetics in Jainism. For those Jains who adopt the path of monks, celibacy in action, words and thoughts is expected. For lay Jains who are married, the virtue of brahmacharya requires remaining sexually faithful to one's chosen partner. For lay Jains who are unmarried, chaste living requires Jains to avoid sex before marriage. Uttam brahmacharya (Supreme Celibacy) is one of the ten excellencies of a Jain monk. Brahmacharya is mentioned as one of the das dharma (ten virtues) in ancient Jain texts like Tattvartha Sutra, Sarvārthasiddhi and Puruşārthasiddhyupāya.

Among Sramanic traditions 
Among the Sramanic traditions (Buddhism, Jainism, Ājīvika, and Charvaka schools), brahmacharya is the term used for a self-imposed practice of celibacy generally considered a prerequisite for spiritual practice. The fourth of the five great vows of Jain monks, for example, is the vow of celibacy, which in this case means a total abstinence from the sensual pleasure of all five senses, including the avoidance of sexual thoughts and desires. The yogin who is firmly grounded in the virtue of brahmacharya is said to gain great vitality.

As Asrama stage of life 

Brahmacharya in Hinduism literally means "conduct consistent with Brahman" or "on the path of Brahman". Historically brahmacharya referred to a stage of life (asrama) within the Vedic ashram system. Ancient Hindu culture divided the human lifespan into four stages: brahmacharya, Grihastha, Vanaprastha and Sannyasa. Brahamacarya asrama occupied the first 20–25 years of life roughly corresponding to adolescence. Upon the child's Upanayanam, the young person would begin a life of study in the Gurukula (the household of the Guru) dedicated to learning all aspects of dharma that is the "principles of righteous living". Dharma comprised personal responsibilities towards himself, family, society, humanity and God which included the environment, earth and nature. This educational period started when the child was five to eight years old and lasted until the age of 14 to 20 years. During this stage of life, the traditional vedic sciences and various sastras were studied along with the religious texts contained within the Vedas and Upanishads. This stage of life was characterized by the practice of celibacy.

In one context, brahmacharya is the first of four ashrama (age-based stages) of a human life, with grihastha (householder), vanaprastha (forest dweller), and sannyasa (renunciation) being the other three asramas. The brahmacharya (bachelor student) stage of life – from childhood up to twenty-five years of age – was focused on education and included the practice of celibacy. In this context, it connotes chastity during the student stage of life for the purposes of learning from a guru (teacher), and during later stages of life for the purposes of attaining spiritual liberation (Sanskrit: moksha).

Naradaparivrajaka Upanishad suggests that the brahmacharya (student) stage of life should extend from the age a child is ready to receive teachings from a guru, and continue for a period of twelve years.

Graduation from the brahmacharya stage of life was marked by the Samavartanam ceremony. The graduate was then ready to either start Grihastha (householder) stage of life, or wait, or pursue a life of Sannyasa and solitude like Rishis in forest. Vyasa in Chapter 234 of Shanti Parva in the Mahabharata praises brahmacharya as an important stage of life necessary for learning, then adds Grihastha stage as the root of society and important to an individual's success.

Brahmacharya for girls
The Vedas and Upanishads do not restrict the student stage of life to males. Atharva Veda, for example, states

No age restrictions
Gonda states that there were no age restrictions for the start of brahmacharya in ancient India. Not only young men, but older people resorted to student stage of life, and sought teachers who were authoritative in certain subjects. The Chandogya Upanishad, in Section 5.11, describes "wealthy and learned householders" becoming brahmacārīs (students) with Rishi Kaikeya, to gain knowledge about Atman (inner Self) and Brahman (Ultimate Reality).

Historical references to brahmacharya 
The Vedas discuss brahmacharya, both in the context of lifestyle and stage of one's life. Rig Veda, for example, in Book 10 Chapter 136, mentions knowledge seekers as those with Kesin (long haired) and soil-colored clothes (yellow, orange, saffron) engaged in the affairs of Mananat (mind, meditation). Rigveda, however, refers to these people as Muni and Vati. The Atharva Veda, completed by about 1000 BC, has more explicit discussion of Brahmacharya, in Book XI Chapter 5. This Chapter of Atharva Veda describes brahmacharya as that which leads to one's second birth (mind, Self-awareness), with Hymn 11.5.3 painting a symbolic picture that when a teacher accepts a brahmacārī, the student becomes his embryo.

The concept and practice of brahmacharya is extensively found among the older strata of the Mukhya Upanishads in Hinduism. The 8th-century BC text Chandogya Upanishad describes in Book 8, activities and lifestyle that is brahmacharya:

A hymn in another early Upanishad, the Mundaka Upanishad in Book 3, Chapter 1 similarly states,

The Vedas and early Upanishadic texts of Hinduism in their discussion of brahmacharya, make no mention of the age of the student at the start of brahmacharya, nor any restraint on sexual activity. However, there is a clear general consensus in both specific and various Upanishads (such as the Shandilya Upanishad) as well as Hindu smritis (such as the Manusmriti) that the male "student", referred to as the "Brahmachari[n]" should abstain from the "release of semen." This rule may or may not apply to the guru. The verses 11.5.4.16 and 11.5.4.17 of the Satpatha Brahamana present two different viewpoints on sexual activity, of the guru during the Brahmacharya ashrama, i.e., the teacher of the "student Brahmachari[n]",  one against and one as a choice. Similarly, in verse 11.5.4.18, the Satapatha Brahamana presents contrasting viewpoints on an eating restraint (regarding honey) for the brahmacārī student.

Among religious movements 
In Indian traditions, a brahmacārī is a male and brahmacārinī a female.

Ashrams and Mathas 
Various Ashrams (आश्रम, hermitage) and Matha (मठ, college of ascetics) of various schools of Hinduism call their male and female initiates as brahmacārī and brahmacārinī.

See also 

 Asceticism
 Atma Shatkam
 Monk
 Yamas
 Yoga Sutras of Patanjali

References

Sources

Further reading 
 Carl Olson, Celibacy and Religious Traditions, Oxford University Press, 
 Elisabeth Haich, Sexual Energy and Yoga. Aurora Press,  (1982)
 Stuart Sovatsky: "Eros, Consciousness and Kundalini: Tantric Celibacy and the Mysteries of Eros". Inner Traditions, Rochester, VT. (1999)
 Swami Narayanananda: The Way to Peace, Power and Long Life. N.U. Yoga Trust, Denmark, 2001 (1st ed. 1945)
 Swami Narayanananda: Brahmacharya, Its Necessity and Practice for Boys and Girls. N.U. Yoga Trust, Denmark, 2001 (1st ed. 1960)

External links 
 Brahmacharya (online book on Brahmacharya by Panyas Shri Chandrashekhar Vijayji)
Brahmacharya Hi Jeevan Hain PDF (Hindi)
Brahmacharya Ki Mahima PDF (Hindi)
Brahmacharya Ki Shakti By Swami Rama Tirtha PDF (Hindi)
Nakedness, Nonviolence, and Brahmacharya: Gandhi's Experiments in Celibate Sexuality Vinay Lal (2000), Journal of the History of Sexuality, Vol. 9, No. 1/2, pp. 105–136
Seminal Truth: A Modern Science of Male Celibacy in North India Joseph S. Alter, Medical Anthropology Quarterly, New Series, Vol. 11, No. 3 (Sep., 1997), pp. 275–298
Ritual, knowledge, and being: initiation and Veda study in ancient India, Brian Smith (1986), Numen, 33(1): 65–89.
Renunciation in the Religious Traditions of South Asia Richard Burghart (1983), Man, 18(4): 635–653.
Brahmacharya – Celibacy and Fidelity Himalayan Academy, Gutenberg Archives
The Role of Celibacy in the Spiritual Life An interview with Swami Chidananda
Practice of Brahmacharya by Swami Sivananda
The Complete Works of Swami Vivekananda Chapters 5, 6 and 7 discuss Vivekananda's views on Brahmacharya
Asceticism
Ashramas
Buddhist philosophical concepts
Hindu monasticism
Hindu philosophical concepts
Jain philosophical concepts
Relational ethics
Jain ethics
Hindu ethics 

Celibacy